Lisbela e o Prisioneiro (Lisbela and the Prisoner) is a 2003 Brazilian romantic comedy film directed by Guel Arraes, based on the 1964 play of the same name by Osman Lins.

Filming took place in cities of Pernambuco, Igarassu, Paudalho and Recife, as well as in Rio de Janeiro and Nova Iguaçu.

Plot
The film tells the story of the trickster, adventurer and conqueror Leléu and the dreamy girl Lisbela who loves to watch American films and dreams of the movie heroes. The story takes place in the 20th century in Pernambuco.
Lisbela (Débora Falabella) is engaged with other man when Leléu (Selton Mello) arrives in the city. The couple is charmed and begins to live a story full of characters taken from the brazilian northeastern scene: Inaura (Virgínia Cavendish), a married and seductive woman, who tries to lure the hero (Leléu) and betray her husband bully and mercenary killer Frederico Evandro (Marco Nanini); Lieutenant Guedes (André Mattos) a stern father and chief of police;  Douglas (Bruno Garcia) a Pernambucano man with Carioca accent and São Paulo's slangs, seen from the perspective of regional humor; and Corporal Citonho (Tadeu Mello) a corporal of detachment, who is cunning enough to satisfy his appetites.

Lisbela and Leléu are going to suffer pressure from her family, the social milieu and also with their own doubts and hesitations. But in a final twist, full of bravery and humor, they follow their destinies. As Lisbela herself says, the fun is not knowing what happens, it is to know how it happens and when it happens.

Cast
 Selton Mello as Leléu
 Débora Falabella as Lisbela
 Virginia Cavendish as Inaura
 Bruno Garcia as Douglas
 Tadeu Mello as Cabo Citonho
 André Mattos as Terente Guedes
 Lívia Falcão as Francisquinha
 Marco Nanini as Frederico Evandro

Awards

Won
 2004 Cinema Brazil Grand Prize 
Best Music: (João Falcão and André Moraes)
Best Actor: (Selton Mello)
 2003 Premio Qualidade
Best Actor: (Marco Nanini)
Best Actress: (Débora Falabella)
Best Director: (Guel Arraes)
Best Film
Best Supporting Actor: (André Mattos)
Best Supporting Actress: (Virginia Cavendish)

Nominated
 2004 Cinema Brazil Grand Prize
Best Costume Design: (Emilia Duncan)
Best Director: (Guel Arraes)
Best Editing: (Paulo Henrique Farias)
Best Make-Up: (Marlene Moura)
Best Picture
Best Screenplay: (Guel Arraes, Jorge Furtado and Pedro Cardoso)
Best Sound
Best Supporting Actor: (Bruno Garcia)
Best Supporting Actor: (Tadeu Mello)
Best Supporting Actress: (Virginia Cavendish)
2003 Premio Qualidade
Best Supporting Actor: (Tadeo Mello)
Best Supporting Actor: (André Mattos)

Soundtrack
Você Não me Ensinou a te Esquecer - Written by Fernando Mendes, performed by Caetano Veloso
Para o Diabo os Conselhos de Vocês - Written by Carlos Imperial, performed by Os Condenados
A Dança das Borboletas - Written by Zé Ramalho and Alceu Valença, performed by Zé Ramalho and Sepultura
Espumas ao Vento - Written by Accioly Neto, performed by Elza Soares
A Dama de Ouro - Written by Maciel Melo, performed by Zéu Britto
A Deusa da Minha Rua - Written by Jorge Faraj and Teixeira, performed by Geraldo Maia
Oh Carol - Written by Neil Sedaka, performed by Caetano Veloso and Jorge Mautner
O Amor é Filme - Written by João Falcão, performed by Lirinha
Lisbela - Written by Caetano Veloso, performed by Los Hermanos
O Matador - Written by João Falcão, performed by Sepultura
O Boi - Written by João Falcão.

See also
 A Dog's Will
 Brega (music)

References

External links
 
 

2003 films
2003 romantic comedy films
Brazilian films based on plays
Brazilian romantic comedy films
Films directed by Guel Arraes
Films shot in Recife
Films shot in Rio de Janeiro (city)